Admiral John Montagu (1719–1795) was an English naval officer and colonial governor of Newfoundland.

Naval career
He was born in 1719, son of James Montagu of Lackham, Lacock, Wiltshire (died 1747), and great-grandson of James Montagu of Lackham (1602–1665), third son of Henry Montagu, 1st Earl of Manchester.
Montagu began his naval career in the Royal Naval Academy, Portsmouth on 14 August 1733.

In 1757 he was present at the execution of Admiral John Byng. Promoted to Rear-Admiral in 1770, he served as Commander-in-Chief of the North American Station from 1771 to 1774.

In March 1772, Montagu was involved in the Gaspee Affair as the commanding officer of Lieutenant William Duddingston, where he unsuccessfully tried to identify and have prosecuted the raiders who attacked Dudingston's ship.

He was promoted Vice-Admiral in 1776 and then appointed Governor and commander-in-chief of Newfoundland. Montagu captured St. Pierre and Miquelon for the British and defended Newfoundland from both French and American privateers. By his swift actions he had prevented the French from capturing Carbonear and Harbour Grace.

In 1783 he was made Commander-in-Chief, Portsmouth. He was promoted to Admiral of the Blue in 1782 and Admiral of the White in 1787.

Family
Montagu married Sophia Wroughton on 2 December 1748 and had one daughter and four sons. Of his sons, George and James became naval officers, while Edward became a lieutenant-colonel in the Royal Artillery. His daughter Sophia lived at Dale Park and the house there was constructed for her and her husband.

References

See also 
 Governors of Newfoundland
 List of people of Newfoundland and Labrador

 

|-

|-

|-

|-

1719 births
1795 deaths
British MPs 1747–1754
Members of the Parliament of Great Britain for English constituencies
Governors of Newfoundland Colony
Royal Navy admirals
John
Royal Navy personnel of the War of the Austrian Succession
People from Fareham